Vatlanovo is a rural locality (a village) in Leskovskoye Rural Settlement, Vologodsky District, Vologda Oblast, Russia. The population was 76 as of 2002.

Geography 
Vatlanovo is located 8 km west of Vologda (the district's administrative centre) by road. Rubtsovo is the nearest rural locality.

References 

Rural localities in Vologodsky District
Vologodsky Uyezd